Star Driver, also known as also known as , is a 2010 Japanese anime television series created and animated by Bones and produced by Aniplex. It takes place on the fictional Southern Cross Isle. It focuses on the teenager named boy Takuto who enrolls in Southern Cross High School as a freshman and makes new friends. However, beneath the school is a group of mysterious giants called Cybodies, which can be controlled by humans in an alternate dimension known as Zero Time. Takuto finds himself dragged into opposition with the Glittering Crux Brigade, a mysterious group that intends to take possession of the island's Cybodies for their own purposes.

The series is directed by Takuya Igarashi, with character designs by Yoshiyuki Ito and Hiroka and Misa Mizuya. The anime premiered on October 3, 2010 and ended on April 3, 2011. The series has been licensed by Aniplex of America and was streamed with English subtitles on Hulu, Crackle, and on Crunchyroll starting on August 17, 2011. Aniplex of America premiered the first episode at the 2010 New York Comic Con/New York Anime Festival on October 9, 2010. The series was collected by Aniplex in a total of nine DVD and Blu-ray volumes. A blu-ray box was also released on January 23, 2013.

The series uses four musical themes: two opening themes and two ending themes. For the first thirteen episode, the opening theme for the series is "Gravity Ø" by Aqua Timez and the ending theme is "Cross Over" by 9nine. From episodes 14-25, the opening theme "Shining Star" by 9nine and the ending theme is "Pride" by Scandal.


Episode list

Notes

References

Star Driver